
"Om / Six Organs of Admittance" is a split 7-inch by the bands Om and Six Organs of Admittance. It was released in 2006 by Holy Mountain Records. During pressing "Side A" and "Side B" labels on the record were accidentally reversed.

Track listing
Side A: Om
"Bedouin's Vigil"Side B: Six Organs of Admittance'''
"Assyrian Blood"

References

2006 singles
Split singles
Om (band) songs
Six Organs of Admittance songs
2006 songs